Litzelbach is a small river of Bavaria, Germany. It flows into the Lohgraben, the upper course of the Geislinger Mühlbach, near Obertraubling.

See also
List of rivers of Bavaria

Rivers of Bavaria
Rivers of Germany